Barbara Maughan is a Professor of Developmental Epidemiology at the Social, Genetic and Developmental Psychiatry Centre, Institute of Psychiatry. Her research focuses on mental health problems in children and adolescents.

Maughan is a member of the Access Committee for CLS Cohorts, which governs the genetic and biomedical data held on the 1958 Birth Cohort (National Child Development Study).

Selected publications

References

20th-century British scientists
20th-century British women scientists
21st-century British scientists
21st-century British women scientists
British psychologists
British women psychologists
Living people
Academics of King's College London
Developmental psychologists
Year of birth missing (living people)